Hypericum balfourii is a species of flowering plant in the family Hypericaceae. It is endemic to Socotra, an island archipelago that is part of Yemen. It grows in mountain shrubland dominated by Cephalocroton. It is usually found on granite terrain above 600 meters in elevation.

References

balfourii
Endemic flora of Socotra
Taxonomy articles created by Polbot